The blood eagle was a method of ritually executing a chosen member as detailed in late skaldic poetry. According to the two instances mentioned in the Sagas, the victims (in both cases members of royal families) were placed in a prone position, their ribs severed from the spine with a sharp tool, and their lungs pulled through the opening to create a pair of "wings". There has been continuing debate about whether the rite was a literary invention, a mistranslation of the original texts, or an authentic historical practice.

Accounts
The blood-eagle ritual-killing rite appears in just two instances in Norse literature, plus oblique references some have interpreted as referring to the same practice. The primary versions share certain commonalities: the victims are both noblemen (Halfdan Haaleg or "Long-leg" was a prince; Ælla of Northumbria a king), and both of the executions were in retaliation for the murder of a father.

Einarr and Halfdan 

There are two sources that purport to describe Torf-Einarr's ritual execution of Harald Fairhair's son, Halfdan Long-Leg, in the late 9th century. Both were written several centuries after the events they depict, and exist in various versions known to have influenced each other.

In the Orkneyinga saga, the blood eagle is described as a sacrifice to Odin.

Snorri Sturluson's Heimskringla contains an account of the same event described in Orkneyinga saga, with Einarr actually performing the deed himself:

Ragnar Lodbrok's sons and King Ælla of Northumbria
In Þáttr af Ragnars sonum (the "Tale of Ragnar's sons"), Ivar the Boneless has captured king Ælla of Northumbria, who had killed Ivar's father Ragnar Loðbrók. The killing of Ælla, after a battle for control of York, is described thus:
 

The blood eagle is referred to by the 11th-century poet Sigvatr Þórðarson, who, some time between 1020 and 1038, wrote a skaldic verse named Knútsdrápa that recounts and establishes Ivar the Boneless as having killed Ælla and subsequently cutting his back.

Sighvatr's skaldic verse:
{|
|- style="text-align:left;"
!width=25%| Original
!width=35%| Literal translation
!width=30%| Suggested reordering
|-
| style="padding-right:1em" | 
| style="padding-right:1em" |And Ella's back,
at, had, the one who dwelt,
Ívarr, with eagle,
York, cut.
|And Ívarr, the one
who dwelt at York,
had Ella's back
cut with [an] eagle.
|}

Skaldic verse, a common medium of Norse poets, was meant to be cryptic and allusive, and the idiomatic nature of Sighvatr's poem as a description of what has become known as the blood eagle is a matter of historical contention, particularly since in Norse imagery the eagle was strongly associated with blood and death.

Saxo Grammaticus in Gesta Danorum tells the following about Bjørn and Sigvard, sons of Ragnar Lodbrok and king Ælla:

Other accounts
Another possible oblique reference to the rite appears in Norna-Gests þáttr. There are two stanzas of verse near the end of its section 6, "Sigurd Felled the Sons of Hunding", where a character describing previous events says:
{|
|style="padding-right:1em;"| 
|style="padding-left:1em;"|Now is the bloody eagle
with a broad sword
carved on the back
of the killer of Sigmund.
Few were better
kinsmen of kings,
who rule land
and gladden the raven.
|}

Authenticity
There is debate about whether the blood eagle was historically practiced, or whether it was a literary device invented by the authors who transcribed the sagas. No contemporary accounts of the rite exist, and the scant references in the sagas are several hundred years after the Christianization of Scandinavia.

In the 1970s Alfred Smyth supported the historicity of the rite, stating that it is clearly human sacrifice to the Norse god Odin. He characterized St. Dunstan's description of Ælla's killing as an "accurate account of a body subjected to the ritual of the blood eagle".

Roberta Frank reviewed the historical evidence for the rite in her "Viking Atrocity and Skaldic Verse: The Rite of the Blood-Eagle", where she writes: "By the beginning of the nineteenth century, the various saga motifs—eagle sketch, rib division, lung surgery, and 'saline stimulant'—were combined in inventive sequences designed for maximum horror." She concludes that the authors of the sagas misunderstood alliterative kennings that alluded to leaving one's foes face down on the battlefield, their backs torn as carrion by scavenging birds. She compared the lurid details of the blood eagle to Christian martyrdom tracts, such as that relating the tortures of Saint Sebastian, shot so full of arrows that his ribs and internal organs were exposed. She suggests that these tales of martyrdom inspired further exaggeration of the misunderstood skaldic verses into a grandiose torture and death rite with no actual historic basis. David Horspool in his book King Alfred: Burnt Cakes and Other Legends, while not committing to the historical veracity of the rite, also saw parallels to martyrdom tracts. Frank's paper sparked a "lively debate".

Ronald Hutton's The Pagan Religions of the Ancient British Isles: Their Nature and Legacy states that "the hitherto notorious rite of the 'Blood Eagle,' the killing of a defeated warrior by pulling up his ribs and lungs through his back, has been shown to be almost certainly a Christian myth resulting from the misunderstanding of some older verse."

While taking no view on the historical authenticity of the ritual, the authors of a 2022 study concluded that the ritual as described was not inconsistent either with physiology or the tools available within the sociocultural context of the Viking era. They further concluded that, were it performed in the most extreme versions depicted in the sagas and the subject of the torture still lived at that point, death would have followed the severing of the ribs from the spine within seconds, due either to exsanguination or asphyxiation.

References

Sources
 

Torture
Execution methods
Viking practices
Early Germanic law
European instruments of torture
Human sacrifice